Marriott Robert Dalway (17 November 1832 – 10 January 1914) was an Irish politician. Although primarily as an Irish Liberal Party member, various sources also designate him as Conservative or Liberal-Conservative.

He was elected as the Member of Parliament (MP) for Carrickfergus at the 1868 general election and held the seat until the 1880 general election.

Dalway was also a High Sheriff of County Antrim in 1859.

He married Elizabeth Barnes, daughter of Andrew Armstrong Barnes and Margaret Livingston, in 1859 and together they had four children:
 Elizabeth (1860–1946)
 Marriott William (born 1861)
 Robert (born 1862)
 John (born 1865)

He died 10 January 1914 in Lorne, Victoria.

References

External links
 

1832 births
1914 deaths
Irish Liberal Party MPs
High Sheriffs of Antrim
UK MPs 1868–1874
UK MPs 1874–1880
Members of the Parliament of the United Kingdom for County Antrim constituencies (1801–1922)